Beverly Leonidas Clarke (February 11, 1809 – March 17, 1860) was a U.S. Representative from Kentucky.  He was known for his "sterling integrity, gentlemanly manners, and polished oratory."

Early life
Clarke was born in Winterfield, Chesterfield County, Virginia, on February 11, 1809. Winterfield was a 210 acre plantation near modern day Midlothian that had a horse racetrack on it. In the 1870s it was subdivided into 65 lots. The current subdivisions of Winterfield Station (2004), Winterfield Park (2016), and Winterfield Crossing (2018) all possess the name of the old plantation and yet are not located on the land of it.

Clarke attended the common school and moved to Kentucky in 1823. He studied law in Franklin, Kentucky, and graduated from the Lexington Law School in 1831.

Career
Clarke was admitted to the bar in 1833 and commenced practice in Franklin, Kentucky. He served as member of the Kentucky House of Representatives in 1841 and 1842.

Clarke was elected as a Democrat to the Thirtieth Congress (March 4, 1847 – March 3, 1849).  He served as delegate to the State constitutional convention in 1849.

Race for Governor of Kentucky
In 1855, Clarke, who was known as old-line conservative and proslavery candidate, was selected as the Democratic nominee for Governor of Kentucky.  His opponent Charles S. Morehead, a former Whig U.S. Representative who ran with the Know-Nothing Party ran a campaign that focused on immigrants and vilified Catholics leading to bloody riots in Louisville.  Although Clarke himself was not a Catholic, his wife was and that was used against him. Clarke had the support of John C. Breckinridge, who (successfully) ran to replace Morehead in the House of Representatives and would later serve as Vice-President of the United States from 1857 to 1861 under President Buchanan.  Clarke was defeated by Morehead (69,816 for Morehead to 65,413 for Clarke) who served until 1859.
Louisville, Kentucky|Louisville

Diplomatic service
On January 7, 1858, he was appointed by President Buchanan as U.S. Minister to Guatemala.  On January 14, 1858, he was also appointed as U.S. Minister to Honduras.  He presented his credentials in Guatemala on July 13, 1858, and in Honduras on August 10, 1858, serving until his death in Guatemala on March 17, 1860.  After moving to Guatemala, Clarke converted to Catholicism, confirmed by Bishop Bernardo Piñol with Pedro de Aycinena y Piñol as his godfather, much to the delight of the people there.

Personal life
Clarke was married to his cousin Mariah Louise Clarke (1818-1847), a devout Roman Catholic. Together, they were the parents of one son and three daughters (all of whom they named after the Virgin Mary), including:

 George W. Clarke
 Mariah "Pauline" Clarke (1837–1876), who married John Singleton Mosby (1833–1916) on December 30, 1856 and moved to Brentmoor in Warrenton, Virginia. Mosby, a Confederate army cavalry battalion commander in the American Civil War, served as the American consul to Hong Kong and in the U.S. Department of Justice.
 Maria "Delia" Clarke
 Mary Clarke

After her death, he married Zenobia Turner. Together, they were the parents of a son:

 Thomas H. Clarke

Clarke died of diabetes in Guatemala City on March 17, 1860, while serving as the U.S. Minister.  He was first buried in Guatemala but later was interred in the State Cemetery, Frankfort, Kentucky, after an act of the Kentucky Legislature.

Descendants
Through his daughter Pauline, he was the grandfather of nine grandchildren of whom six survived.

References
Notes

Sources

External links
 Kentucky Historical Society: Explore Kentucky: Beverly L. Clarke

1809 births
1860 deaths
19th-century American diplomats
19th-century American politicians
Ambassadors of the United States to Guatemala
Ambassadors of the United States to Honduras
Democratic Party members of the United States House of Representatives from Kentucky
Kentucky lawyers
Democratic Party members of the Kentucky House of Representatives
People from Franklin, Kentucky
People from Chesterfield County, Virginia
American Roman Catholics
19th-century American lawyers